The nucleocapsid (N) protein is a protein that packages the positive-sense RNA genome of coronaviruses to form ribonucleoprotein structures enclosed within the viral capsid. The N protein is the most highly expressed of the four major coronavirus structural proteins. In addition to its interactions with RNA, N forms protein-protein interactions with the coronavirus membrane protein (M) during the process of viral assembly. N also has additional functions in manipulating the cell cycle of the host cell.  The N protein is highly immunogenic and antibodies to N are found in patients recovered from SARS and Covid-19.

History
The coronavirus was first identified in January 2020. A patient in the state of Washington was given a diagnosis of coronavirus infection on 20 January. A group of scientists based at the Centers for Disease Control and Prevention in Atlanta, Georgia isolated the virus from nasopharyngeal and oropharyngeal swabs and were able to characterize the genomic sequence, replication properties and cell culture tropism from the swabs. They made available the virus to the wider scientific community shortly thereafter "by depositing it into two virus reagent repositories".

Structure

The N protein is composed of two main protein domains connected by an intrinsically disordered region (IDR) known as the linker region, with additional disordered segments at each terminus. A third small domain at the C-terminal tail appears to have an ordered alpha helical secondary structure and may be involved in the formation of higher-order oligomeric assemblies. In SARS-CoV, the causative agent of SARS, the N protein is 422 amino acid residues long and in SARS-CoV-2, the causative agent of Covid-19, it is 419 residues long.

Both the N-terminal and C-terminal domains are capable of binding RNA. The C-terminal domain forms a dimer that is likely to be the native functional state. Parts of the IDR, particularly a conserved sequence motif rich in serine and arginine residues (the SR-rich region), may also be implicated in dimer formation, though reports on this vary. Although higher-order oligomers formed through the C-terminal domain have been observed crystallographically, it is unclear if these structures have a physiological role.

The C-terminal dimer has been structurally characterized by X-ray crystallography for several coronaviruses and has a highly conserved structure. The N-terminal domain - sometimes known as the RNA-binding domain, though other parts of the protein also interact with RNA - has also been crystallized and has been studied by nuclear magnetic resonance spectroscopy in the presence of RNA.

Post-translational modifications
The N protein is post-translationally modified by phosphorylation at sites located in the IDR, particularly in the SR-rich region. SARS-CoV-2
nucleocapsid (N) protein is arginine methylated by protein arginine methyltransferase 1 (PRMT1)at residues R95 and R177. Type I PRMT inhibitor (MS023) or substitution of R95 or R177 with lysine inhibited interaction of N protein with the 5’-UTR of SARS-CoV-2 genomic RNA, a property required for viral packaging | doi: 10.1016/j.jbc.2021.100821 | PMID 34029587. In several coronaviruses, ADP-ribosylation of the N protein has also been reported. With unclear functional significance, the SARS-CoV N protein has been observed to be SUMOylated and the N proteins of several coronaviruses including SARS-CoV-2 have been observed to be proteolytically cleaved.

Expression and localization
The N protein is the most highly expressed in host cells of the four major structural proteins. Like the other structural proteins, the gene encoding the N protein is located toward the 3' end of the genome.

N protein is localized primarily to the cytoplasm. In many coronaviruses, a population of N protein is localized to the nucleolus, thought to be associated with its effects on the cell cycle.

Function

Genome packaging and viral assembly

The N protein binds to RNA to form ribonucleoprotein (RNP) structures for packaging the genome into the viral capsid. The RNP particles formed are roughly spherical and are organized in flexible helical structures inside the virus. Formation of RNPs is thought to involve allosteric interactions between RNA and multiple RNA-binding regions of the protein. Dimerization of N is important for assembly of RNPs. Encapsidation of the genome occurs through interactions between N and M. N is essential for viral assembly. N also serves as a chaperone protein for the formation of RNA structure in the genomic RNA.

Genomic and subgenomic RNA synthesis
Synthesis of genomic RNA appears to involve participation by the N protein. N is physically colocalized with the viral RNA-dependent RNA polymerase early in the replication cycle and forms interactions with non-structural protein 3, a component of the replicase-transcriptase complex. Although N appears to facilitate efficient replication of genomic RNA, it is not required for RNA transcription in all coronaviruses. In at least one coronavirus, transmissible gastroenteritis virus (TGEV), N is involved in template switching in the production of subgenomic mRNAs, a process that is a distinctive feature of viruses in the order Nidovirales.

Cell cycle effects
Coronaviruses manipulate the cell cycle of the host cell through various mechanisms. In several coronaviruses, including SARS-CoV, the N protein has been reported to cause cell cycle arrest in S phase through interactions with cyclin-CDK. In SARS-CoV, a cyclin box-binding region in the N protein can serve as a cyclin-CDK phosphorylation substrate. Trafficking of N to the nucleolus may also play a role in cell cycle effects. More broadly, N may be involved in reduction of host cell protein translation activity.

Immune system effects
The N protein is involved in viral pathogenesis via its effects on components of the immune system. In SARS-CoV, MERS-CoV, and SARS-CoV-2, N has been reported as suppressing interferon responses.

Evolution and conservation
The sequences and structures of N proteins from different coronaviruses, particularly the C-terminal domains, appear to be well conserved. Similarities between the structure and topology of the N proteins of coronaviruses and arteriviruses suggest a common evolutionary origin and supports the classification of these two groups in the common order Nidovirales.

Examination of SARS-CoV-2 sequences collected during the Covid-19 pandemic found that missense mutations were most common in the central linker region of the protein, suggesting this relatively unstructured region is more tolerant of mutations than the structured domains. A separate study of SARS-CoV-2 sequences identified at least one site in the N protein under positive selection.

The N protein's properties of being well conserved, not appearing to recombine frequently, and producing a strong T-cell response have led to it being studied as a potential target for coronavirus vaccines. The vaccine candidate UB-612 is one such experimental vaccine that targets the N protein, along with other viral proteins, to attempt to induce broad immunity.

References

Coronavirus proteins
Viral protein class
Viral structural proteins